Bavayia occidentalis is a species of geckos endemic to New Caledonia.

References

Bavayia
Reptiles described in 2022
Taxa named by Aaron M. Bauer
Taxa named by Ross Allen Sadlier
Taxa named by Todd R. Jackman
Geckos of New Caledonia